Paradesi is a 2013 Indian Tamil-language period drama film written and directed by Bala starring Atharvaa, Vedhika and Dhansika. The film's music was scored by G. V. Prakash Kumar. The film was based on novel Eriyum Panikadu, Tamil translation of the 1969 English novel Red Tea by Paul Harris Daniel and inspired from real life incidents that took place before independence in the 1930s. It was released on 15 March 2013. The dubbed version of Telugu was released with the same name. The film opened to highly positive reviews with critics mainly praising the performances of the cast and the direction of Bala. The movie was an average grosser at the box office

Plot 
Raasa (Atharvaa) is a carefree young man living in a rural village in the Madras Presidency during the early days of the British Raj. Orphaned at a young age, he is brought up by his grandmother. Angamma (Vedhika), a local girl, falls for him and takes pleasure in bullying him. When she finally confesses her feelings for him, they become intimate and soon reveal the fact that they are in love before the entire village. Angamma's mother objects as Raasa is unemployed and irresponsible, making him undeserving of marrying anyone.

Raasa then goes to the nearby village in search of work. He comes across a friendly Kangani, who then follows Raasa back to his village. The Kangani offers a work for the villagers at the British tea plantations at the hillside. He promises them proper accommodation and high wages. Like many of the villagers, Raasa signs up with the Kangani, hoping that he can send home money every month for his ailing grandmother. Both Angamma and his grandmother are sad to watch him leave.

When Raasa and his villagers finally arrive at the tea plantation, things are not as what the Kangani promised. The Kangani and his henchmen rule the plantation with an iron fist. The British plantation manager does not care for the workers. Raasa becomes friends with Maragadham (Dhansika) and her little daughter, the wife and child of the only worker who have ever escaped the plantation so far. Raasa soon gets a letter from his grandmother stating that Angamma now lives with her after her family found out she is pregnant with his child.

It is soon revealed that all the workers' daily wages go to their food and lodging. Raasa will have to work there for many more months if he wishes to leave the place. Maragadham too has to work for both her time and for her husband's contract. The workers finally realise that they have been made slaves to the British businessmen. Feeling homesick, Raasa tries to escape. Unfortunately, he is caught by the Kangani's henchmen and cuts the left leg main bone (fibula), just like every other worker who had tried to escape and failed.

An epidemic soon kills many workers in the plantation, including one of Raasa's villagers. During a tea party, an English socialite asks the plantation manager to bring in a real doctor to treat the workers. A doctor from Madras in the form of an Indian Christian convert and his English wife come to the plantation. However, rather than treating the sick workers, they spend all their time trying to convert them.

Raasa's time at the plantation draws to an end. Unfortunately, he cannot rejoice as Maragadham becomes ill and finally dies. He then adopts her daughter and awaits his time to leave. However, he is then told that by adopting Maragadham's daughter, he has also inherited both her parents' debt to the plantation and will have to work there for almost 10 more years to pay it all off. As he is lamenting his fate on top of a hill, he notices a new group of slaves being brought in. Among them, he sees Angamma and their son. He runs after them and in tears, tells them that they have both walked into the mouth of hell.

The film ends with a wide shot of the tea plantation and all its workers staring at Rasa crying his heart out.

Cast 
 Atharvaa as Raasa
 Vedhika as Angamma
 Dhansika as Maragadham
 Dhanalakshmi/Harini as Valli 
 Riythvika as Karuthakanni
 Puvisha Manoharan as Elizabeth
 Karthick Ashokan as Thangarasu
 Jerry as Kangaani
 K. Sivasankar as Parisutham
 Kalpana Shree as Angamma's mother

Production

Development 
Paradesi, a pejorative Tamil term meaning a foreigner or wastrel, deals with the story of enslaved tea plantation workers in pre-independent India. The film has been adapted from Eriyum Panikadu a Tamil translation of the 1969 novel Red Tea by Paul Harris Daniel which deals with Harris's encounters with enslaved tea plantation workers in the Madras Presidency in colonial India.

Casting 
Adharvaa was signed on to play the lead role, in his third leading role after Baana Kaathadi and Muppozhudhum Un Karpanaigal, and Bala asked him to shed 10 kilos and sport a shaved hairstyle. Initial reports suggested that Amy Jackson would play a pivotal role in the film, but the actress denied that she was approached for the role. Vedika was signed to act in the film after a brief sabbatical away from Tamil films and the project marked her most high-profile venture til date. Bala roped in about 200 junior artistes for this film and had them all go bald, requesting them to stay bald throughout the 200-day schedule as it is one of the major requirements for the film.

News reports suggested that Uma Riyaz Khan's performance in Mouna Guru prompted Bala to ask the actress to play Adharvaa's mother in the movie, though she eventually did not play the character. Pooja, who had appeared in Bala's 2011 film Naan Kadavul, was originally selected to play a crucial role in this movie, but later had to opt out owing to call-sheet problems. She was subsequently replaced by Dhansika, who during post-production publicity noted that she starved for six days to achieve her look in the climax portions of the film. Actor Srinivasan shot for a sequence in the film, but Bala's unhappiness with the output saw the actor later replaced by choreographer Shivshankar in the brief role. Aishwarya Rajesh later informed that she had auditioned for a role in the film.

Filming 
First schedule of the film has been completed on 28 January 2012 on Ramanathapuram and the team is getting ready to start the next schedule in Connoor. However, with the tiff between the FEFSI and Producers' Council still going on, the director has decided to postpone the shooting schedules until the issue is resolved. The film was shot in Salur and Manamadurai in Sivagangai district, Munnar and Talaiyar in Kerala, and the forest areas in Theni district. To get her act right in the climax scene, Dhansika survived with mere water and fruit juice for six consecutive days. The film that was wrapped in just 90 days had released its first look poster on 8 August 2012.

Promotion and release 
Though early reports stated that Paradesi would release in October 2012, it was later announced that it would release on 21 December 2012.

A one-minute reality trailer drew controversies as soon as a preview was released on YouTube. It showed Bala hitting and abusing the actors. Later after the release, the scenes were shown to be a part of the film and Adharva tweeted on his Twitter saying that the sticks Bala used were just dummies.

After the film was cleared by the Indian Censor Board, its release was postponed to January 2013, and later to March. Finally it was released on 15 March 2013.

Soundtrack 

The soundtrack was composed by G. V. Prakash Kumar. The audio launch and trailer release of the film happened on 25 November 2012 at Sathyam cinemas, Chennai. Vairamuthu joined hands with director Bala for the first time in this film. Prakash Kumar composed the music and Vairamuthu wrote the lyrics based on what has been shot.

On the music, Behindwoods wrote that the instruments used "achieves an undistracted and uniform sound-and-feel throughout this album and it succeeds in placing the listener in the time and place of the story". It gave a rating of 2.5 out of 5 stars.

Critical reception 
S Saraswathi of Rediff rated the film 4 stars out of 5, saying "Bala's Paradesi stays with you long after you walk out of the theatre. In fact you need a few minutes to reorient yourself back to the present, Bala captivates with his authentic script, unadorned visuals and down-to-earth characters. A must-watch." Sify said, "Paradesi may be too dark for some viewers. But here is a definitive movie that touches a deep emotional chord and will leave a lump in your throat. Paradesi is definitively a classic with grace and power", going on to call it "brilliant". Shankar Ganesh rated it 4 out of 5 and stated that "Paradesi is dark, gritty and bloody realistic & concluded that it's film-making at its best. A must watch!" IBN Live called the film "pure unadulterated cinema and the screenplay and the plot rank high above everything else" and "a master class in great filmmaking". One India stated, "Paradesi is a brilliant made movie but the lack of commercial elements will not guarantee the success".

The Hindu wrote, "(The) traditional commercial-film elements are an odd fit in a film that's attempting to be something wholly different. Paradesi is an important lesson on a forgotten chapter of history, but as cinema, Bala's truest isn't up there with Bala's best." Nandini Ramnath of Livemint said, "During Paradesi'''s most heightened moments, it appears as though Bala is single-handedly trying to undo that cinematic legacy" and concluded, "Paradesi clocks a crisp 120 minutes– not enough to replicate the richness of Pithamagan and Avan Ivan, and not enough to accommodate new ideas on age-old forms of exploitation".

Box office

 Accolades Paradesi'' won the National Film Award for Best Costume Design for designer Poornima Ramaswamy, who worked on her first film. It received nine Filmfare Awards South nominations including Best Tamil Film (Bala) and Best Tamil Actress (Vedhika), and went on to win for Best Tamil Director (Bala), Best Tamil Actor (Atharvaa) and Best Tamil Supporting Actress (Dhansika).

See also 
 List of films featuring slavery

References

External links 

2013 films
Indian drama films
Films based on Indian novels
Films scored by G. V. Prakash Kumar
Films directed by Bala (director)
2010s Tamil-language films
Films shot in Ooty
Films shot in Munnar
Films set in the British Raj
Films that won the Best Costume Design National Film Award